Ignacio Zaragoza   is one of the 67 municipalities of Chihuahua, in northern Mexico, named after Ignacio Zaragoza. The municipal seat lies at Ignacio Zaragoza town. The municipality covers an area of 2,130.9 km2.

As of 2010, the municipality had a total population of 6,934, up from 6,631 as of 2005.

As of 2010, the town of Ignacio Zaragoza had a population of 3,518. Other than the town of Ignacio Zaragoza, the municipality had 105 localities, none of which had a population over 1,000.

Geography

Towns and villages
The municipality has 43 localities. The largest are:

References

Municipalities of Chihuahua (state)